The Lords of High Decision is a 1916 American silent drama film, directed by Jack Harvey. It stars Cyril Scott, Joseph W. Girard, and William Welsh.

Cast
Cyril Scott - Wayne Craighill
Joseph W. Girard - Colonel Graighill
William Welsh - Walsh
Joseph Daly - Gregory
Marguerite Skirvin -Jean
Mildred Gregory - Adelaide Churchill
Mathilde Brundage - Mrs. Churchill

References

External links
 The Lords of High Decision at IMDb.com

lobby poster

1916 films
American silent feature films
Silent American drama films
1916 drama films
Films directed by Jack Harvey
American black-and-white films
Films based on American novels
1910s American films